Klaprothia is a genus of flowering plants belonging to the family Loasaceae.

Its native range is Mexico to southern Tropical America and Hispaniola. It is found in the countries of Bolivia, Brazil, Colombia, Costa Rica, Ecuador, El Salvador, Galápagos, Guatemala, Haiti, Honduras, Mexico, Nicaragua, Panamá, Peru and Venezuela.

The genus name of Klaprothia is in honour of Martin Heinrich Klaproth (1743–1817), a German chemist.
It was first described and published in (F.W.H.von Humboldt, A.J.A.Bonpland & C.S.Kunth) Nov. Gen. Sp. Vol.6 on page 121 in 1823.

Species
According to Kew:
Klaprothia fasciculata 
Klaprothia mentzelioides

References

Loasaceae
Cornales genera
Plants described in 1823
Flora of Central America
Flora of western South America
Flora of Brazil
Flora of Mexico
Flora of Haiti